Shaxian District, formerly Sha County, is a District of Sanming, Fujian Province, People's Republic of China. Shaxian District is the hometown of Shaxian delicacies, which are considered part of the food heritage of China.

Transportation
Shaxian District is served by Sanming North railway station and Sanming Shaxian Airport.

Climate

Administrative divisions
Subdistricts:
Fenggang Subdistrict, Qiujiang Subdistrict

Towns:
Qingzhou, Xiamao, Gaosha, Gaoqiao, Fukou, Daluo

Townships:

Nanxia Township, Nanyang Township, Zhenghu Township, Huyuan Township

References

 
County-level divisions of Fujian
Sanming